RC Evko-More (RK Evko-More) is a Ukrainian rugby club in Feodosiya. They currently play in Group A of the Ukraine Rugby Superliga.

History
The club was founded in 1973.

External links
RC Evko More at rugby.org.ua

Rugby clubs established in 1973
Ukrainian rugby union teams